Latexo is a city in Houston County, Texas, United States. Its population was 322 at the 2010 census.

History
Just after 1900, the Louisiana Texas Orchard Company purchased  surrounding the settlement and platted a town named "Latexo", an acronym of the company's name. Five schools have been  built over the years in the community and the city of Latexo.
 
This building was later occupied as the home of Cleveland Willis. The second Bethel school built in the community was located on a street that went east from what was at that time the main road that ran south along the railroad tracks. This site in the 1960s and later years was known as the home site of the Stokes Reed family. This building was later sold (around 1930) to the Baptist Church and was used as such for many years.

The third site of the school was located about two houses east of the second site and was the location of what was referred to as the old Ed Burton home, but was the Bill McKinney home in 1961, and later the Clifford Price home.  The third school was moved in 1930 to the present location. Two new buildings have been built on the same school property, replacing the previous building.

Geography

Latexo is located north of the center of Houston County at  (31.389285, –95.474699). U.S. Route 287 is the main road through the city, leading south  to Crockett, the county seat, and north  to Grapeland.

Demographics

As of the census of 2000, 272 people, 116 households, and 70 families were residing in the city. The population density was 276.0 people per square mile (106.1/km2). The 136 housing units averaged 138.0 per mi2 (53.0/km2). The racial makeup of the city was 90.07% White, 3.31% African American, 21.37% Native American, 0.37% Asian, 3.68% from other races, and 2.21% from two or more races. Hispanics or Latinos of any race were 5.51% of the population.

Of the 116 households, 29.3% had children under the age of 18 living with them, 46.6% were married couples living together, 11.2% had a female householder with no husband present, and 38.8% were not families. About 36.2% of all households were made up of individuals, and 16.4% had someone living alone who was 65 years of age or older. The average household size was 2.34, and the average family size was 3.04.

In the city, theage distribution was 26.5% under 18, 9.6% from 18 to 24, 27.2% from 25 to 44, 21.7% from 45 to 64, and 15.1% who were 65 or older. The median age was 39 years. For every 100 females, there were 88.9 males. For every 100 females age 18 and over, there were 81.8 males.

The median income for a household in the city was $22,750, and for a family was $35,833. Males had a median income of $29,583 versus $18,750 for females. The per capita income for the city was $15,603. About 21.4% of families and 22.7% of the population were below the poverty line, including 27.2% of those under the age of 18 and 12.7% of those 65 or over.

Education
The city is served by the Latexo Independent School District.

References

Cities in Texas
Cities in Houston County, Texas
1900s establishments in Texas